KCTX may refer to:

 KCTX (AM), a radio station (1510 AM) licensed to Childress, Texas, United States
 KCTX-FM, a radio station (96.1 FM) licensed to Childress, Texas, United States